R.T. (Jija) Deshmukh is a member of the 13th Maharashtra Legislative Assembly. He represents the Majalgaon Assembly Constituency.

References

Members of the Maharashtra Legislative Assembly
Living people
Marathi politicians
Year of birth missing (living people)
Bharatiya Janata Party politicians from Maharashtra